Per Haraldsen (5 December 1892 – 20 February 1928) was a Norwegian footballer. He played in four matches for the Norway national football team between 1912 and 1916.

References

External links
 

1892 births
1928 deaths
Norwegian footballers
Norway international footballers
Sportspeople from Skien
Association football forwards